Joachim Wilhelm Robert Feulgen (2 September 1884 – 24 October 1955) was a German physician and chemist who, in 1914, developed a method for staining DNA (now known as the Feulgen stain) and who also discovered plant and animal nuclear DNA ("thymonucleic acid") congeniality.

References

1884 births
1955 deaths
20th-century German chemists